Mary Joan "Mary Jo" Peppler (born October 17, 1944) is a retired American volleyball player and coach. Peppler was inducted into the Volleyball Hall of Fame in 1990. She also played professional basketball with the New Jersey Gems of the Women's Professional Basketball League for one season.

Early life
Peppler was born in Rockford, Illinois. At the age of 6 she moved to Texas. She signed up for the Girls Athletic Association in the 4th grade; it was then that she learned of her love for volleyball. Peppler attended Sul Ross State and was a six time All-American.

Coaching
Peppler has coached (as the assistant or head coach) at Utah State, Florida and Kentucky.

While at Sul Ross State (Alpine, TX) she guided her team to back to back Division I National championships, going 70-0  over two seasons. She guided E. Pluribus Unum of Houston, Texas to crowns in 1972 in Salt Lake City and 1973 in Duluth, Minnesota, and Utah State University to the championship in 1981 in Arlington, Texas.

From 1991–96, she mentored the number-one women's beach volleyball team of Karolyn Kirby and Liz Masakayan.  In the 2000s, she coached Bulgaria's women's Olympic beach volleyball team, Lina and Petia Yanchulova.

In 2017 Mary Jo began serving as assistant coach to head coach Karolyn Kirby at the University of Saint Katherine in San Marcos, CA in the university's first year of having both a men's and women's volleyball team.

Olympics
Peppler's international experience includes playing on the 1964 U.S. Olympic Team, on the 1967 U.S. Gold Medal Pan American Team (named to All Tournament Team), and at the 1970 World Championships where she was named the tournament's most outstanding player. In 1975 she won ABC's inaugural Women's Superstars competition and in the softball throw competition threw the ball over the judge's head and the fence behind him.

Professional
Professionally, Peppler was the player/coach for the El Paso Sol (1975) and Phoenix Heat (1976) of the International Volleyball Association as well as Major League Volleyball's New York Liberties in 1987 and 1988.

Other honors Peppler received include All-Star honors in 1987 and 1988, All-Pro award in 1987, and the USVBA's "All-Time Great Player" Award in 1982. She was inducted into the Women's Sports Hall of Fame in 1983.

In 1978-79, Peppler joined the New Jersey Gems of the brand-new Women's Professional Basketball League.

Books
 Wrote Inside Volleyball for Women (Copyright 1977)
 Contributed to Coaching tips for the 90's (Copyright 1991)
 Wrote Chapter 10 of the Volleyball Coaching Bible entitled "Using New and Proven Teaching Techniques" (Copyright 2002)

References

External links
 Mary Jo Peppler biography

1944 births
Living people
American women's volleyball players
American volleyball coaches
Olympic volleyball players of the United States
Volleyball players at the 1964 Summer Olympics
Volleyball players at the 1967 Pan American Games
Pan American Games gold medalists for the United States
Utah State Aggies coaches
Sportspeople from Rockford, Illinois
Writers from Texas
Pan American Games medalists in volleyball
Medalists at the 1967 Pan American Games
Women's Professional Basketball League players